John Torrey (27 August 1800 – 15 December 1879)  was a Scottish Episcopalian priest who served as Dean of  St Andrews, Dunkeld and Dunblane.

The son of Bishop Patrick Torry, he was born in Peterhead and educated at Marischal College. Ordained in 1823, he was  the curate at Peterhead and then the incumbent at Coupar-Angus, Meigle, and Alyth for thirty years. He was Dean of  St Andrews, Dunkeld and Dunblane from 1839 until his death.

References

1800 births
Alumni of the University of Aberdeen
Deans of St Andrews, Dunkeld and Dunblane
1879 deaths
People from Peterhead
Scottish Episcopalian deans